Rita Sever is an American television hostess and actress. Sever, who is the youngest of seven children, was born on November 7, 1963 in San Francisco, California. She is best known as the host of  the NBC late-night series Friday Night Videos from 1994 to the show's end in 2000. She has also appeared as a guest host on NBC's Later with Greg Kinnear for 3 episodes.

References

External links

Living people
1963 births
Television personalities from California
People from San Francisco